Zhong Shaojun (born 19 October 1968) is a long-time political aide of Xi Jinping, currently the General Secretary of the Chinese Communist Party (CCP) and Chairman of the Central Military Commission (CMC). Zhong served on Xi's staff beginning in Zhejiang province, then followed him to Shanghai, and then Beijing. Zhong currently serves as the director of Xi Jinping’s Office and director of the General Office of the Central Military Commission. He holds the military rank of Lieutenant general in 2019.

Career
Zhong was born in Kaihua County, Zhejiang, near the modern city of Quzhou. He hold a master's degree from Zhejiang University. He once served as the deputy head of the provincial party's Organization Department in Zhejiang.

It is not clear when Zhong began working for Xi, but evidence suggests that Zhong was on Xi's staff at least as early as when Xi was serving as the Communist Party Secretary of Zhejiang province. In Zhejiang, Zhong often drafted Xi's official statements. Upon the sacking of Chen Liangyu due to a corruption scandal, the central authorities selected Xi to fill the position vacated by Chen as party chief of Shanghai. The transfer elevated Xi from a relatively unknown provincial administrator to the front runner to succeed Hu Jintao as the next leader of the Communist Party. Zhong then followed Xi to Shanghai and took on the title of deputy chief of the municipal party General Office, and often accompanied Xi on visits. When Xi was transferring his duties to his successor as Zhejiang party chief Zhao Hongzhu, Zhong would frequently accompany Xi on trips between Shanghai and Hangzhou. It was said that on some trips, Zhong was the only person accompanying Xi.

In the fall of 2007, Xi was transferred to Beijing to become a member of the Politburo Standing Committee and the secretary of the Secretariat of the Chinese Communist Party. Zhong was promptly also transferred to Beijing to work for the General Office of the Chinese Communist Party. Upon arriving in Beijing, Zhong also enrolled in a doctorate program at the prestigious Tsinghua University, some say he was admitted with the help of then Tsinghua party chief and friend Chen Xi. On June 11, 2013, Zhong was seen in military uniform (with the rank insignia of a senior colonel) on national television watching the launch of the Shenzhou 10 spacecraft at the Jiuquan Satellite Launch Centre accompanying Xi Jinping.

Zhong's relationship with Xi has been compared to that between former General Secretary Jiang Zemin and his former secretary Jia Ting'an (later promoted to General in the People's Liberation Army) and that between former General Secretary Hu Jintao and his chief aide Ling Jihua. However, there is not much publicly available information about Zhong or about his relationship with Xi Jinping. He has additionally been named as a member of the "New Zhijiang Army", that is, a trusted lieutenant of Xi Jinping who shares Xi's political philosophies and who may become an important political player or be destined for higher office in the near future.

References 

1968 births
Living people
Zhejiang University alumni
People's Republic of China politicians from Zhejiang
Politicians from Quzhou
People's Liberation Army generals from Zhejiang